Political parties in Northern Ireland lists political parties in Northern Ireland. 
The Northern Ireland Assembly is elected by single transferable vote and the composition of the Northern Ireland Executive is by power sharing determined by the D'Hondt system, among the members elected to the Assembly. Party affiliation is generally based on religious and ethnic background.

Although Northern Ireland is a part of the United Kingdom, it has a quite distinct party system from the rest of the country, as the Labour Party and Liberal Democrats do not contest elections there (though the Liberal Democrats have links with the Alliance Party), and the Conservative Party has received only limited support in recent elections.

Some parties, such as Sinn Féin and the Workers' Party, are organised on an all-Ireland basis. Others such as the Conservative Party are organised on an all-United Kingdom basis. There are many Northern Ireland-specific parties and these, on the whole, predominate.

The distinction between "unionist/loyalist", "nationalist/republican" and "other" is not always easy with some parties and individuals. Some have defined themselves less by their position on the "Border Question" than on other political issues.

For example, the former Republican Labour Party/Social Democratic and Labour Party MP Gerry Fitt's career suggests he was first and foremost a socialist rather than a nationalist and he eventually left the SDLP claiming it had drifted from its founding intentions. Similarly the Workers' Party has its roots in the republican Official IRA but nowadays is considered to be a non-violent socialist and nationalist party. Several parties strive to be avowedly non-sectarian and would not consider themselves to be either unionist or nationalist. The Northern Ireland Assembly requires MLAs to designate themselves either "Unionist", "Nationalist" or "Other." This is a designation that is particularly resented by those who designate as "Other", as they have no input on who becomes First or Deputy First Minister.

There are some who see the terms "Unionist"/"Loyalist" and "Nationalist"/"Republican" as being of more relevance to the community that the party seeks to represent rather than the position on the border question. Several of the "Other" parties strive to be non-sectarian but have a clear position on the border.

Political parties with elected representation at a local, national, UK or European level

Party details

Party representation

Other registered parties

Unionist and loyalist
 Northern Ireland Conservatives
 Heritage Party

Nationalist and republican
 Communist Party of Ireland (CPI)
 Éirígí - Registered to contest local elections only
 Fianna Fáil (FF) - Registered, but has not contested elections, in partnership with the SDLP
 Irish Republican Socialist Party (IRSP) - Registered to contest local elections only
 Republican Network for Unity (RNU) - Registered
Saoradh 
Socialist Workers Network (SWN)
Workers' Party - Registered, historically fielded candidates

Others
 Cross-Community Labour Alternative
 Irish Labour Party - The Irish Labour Party has a policy not to stand for elections in Northern Ireland, though it has previously. It currently supports the SDLP.
 Labour Party in Northern Ireland - The British Labour Party has a policy not to stand in Northern Ireland. Until recently it was not possible for residents to even join the party; however this was changed on legal advice. The Labour Party has recently set up an officially recognised branch party in the region. The SDLP MPs unofficially take the Labour whip.
 Northern Ireland Liberal Democrats - The Liberal Democrats currently have a policy not to stand in Northern Ireland but to support their sister party, the Alliance, with many holding membership of both, and Alliance peers take the Liberal Democrat whip. 
 Official Monster Raving Loony Party - Registered, but has not yet contested elections
 Socialist Party

Unregistered parties
Candidates for unregistered parties may choose either to be listed as "Non-Party", or to leave the section blank on the ballot paper, in the same manner as independent candidates.
 32 County Sovereignty Movement - Does not contest elections, operates as a pressure group
 Republican Sinn Féin (RSF)
 National Party
Fine Gael

Inactive parties

Unionist and loyalist
Belfast Labour Party
British Ulster Dominion Party
Commonwealth Labour Party
Independent Unionist Association
Labour Unionist Party
NI21
 UKIP Northern Ireland
Northern Ireland Unionist Party - deregistered 2008
Protestant Coalition
Protestant Unionist Party (evolved into the DUP)
Ulster Constitution Party
Ulster Democratic Party
Ulster Loyalist Democratic Party
Ulster Popular Unionist Party
Ulster Progressive Unionist Association
Ulster Protestant League
Ulster Resistance
Ulster Unionist Labour Association
Unionist Party of Northern Ireland
United Kingdom Unionist Party - deregistered 2008
United Ulster Unionist Council
United Ulster Unionist Party
United Unionist Coalition (UUC)
Vanguard Progressive Unionist Party
Volunteer Political Party

Nationalist and Republican
All Ireland Anti-Partition League
Federation of Labour
Fianna Uladh
Irish Anti-Partition League
Independent Socialist Party
Irish Independence Party
National Democratic Party
National League of the North
National Unity
Nationalist Party
Northern Council for Unity
Official Sinn Féin (now Workers' Party)
People's Democracy
Red Republican Party
Republican Congress
Republican Labour Party
Saor Éire
Socialist Republican Party
Unity

Others
Commonwealth Labour Party
Communist Party of Ireland (Marxist-Leninist)
Communist Party of Northern Ireland
Irish Labour Party (contests elections in the Republic)
Labour coalition
Labour Party of Northern Ireland
Northern Ireland Labour Party
Northern Ireland Women's Coalition
Newtownabbey Labour Party
Newtownabbey Ratepayers Association
Natural Law Party
Social Democratic Party - The post-1988 rump of the party stood in a Northern Ireland by-election in 1990; the party as a whole existed and was more prominent in Great Britain from 1981 to 1988 although the post-1990 rump group still exists.
Ulster Independence Movement
Ulster Liberal Party
Ulster Movement for Self-Determination
United Labour Party (Northern Ireland)
Ulster Third Way - deregistered 2005
Veritas - Dissolved June 2015
Vote for Yourself Party - disbanded April 2009, de-registered 8 June 2009
World Socialist Party (Ireland) - Dissolved in the 1990s

Flowchart of all political parties in Northern Ireland

Party leaders
Party leaders serving 10 years or more are

See also
 Politics of Northern Ireland
 Lists of political parties
 Political make-up of local councils in Northern Ireland
 List of political parties in the Republic of Ireland

References
Sources

Political parties
 
+Northern
Political
Northern Ireland